Yelloly is a surname. Notable people with the surname include:

John Yelloly (1774–1842), English physician
Nick Yelloly (born 1990), British racing driver